The Indian Institutes of Technology (IITs) are prestigious central government owned public technical institutes located across India. Known for their excellence in education, they are under the ownership of the Ministry of Education of the Government of India. They are governed by the Institutes of Technology Act, 1961, declaring them as Institutes of National Importance and laying down their powers, duties, and framework for governance as the country's premier institutions in the field of technology. The act currently lists twenty-three IITs. Each IIT has autonomy and is linked to others through a common council called the IIT Council, which oversees their administration. The Minister of Education of India is the ex officio Chairperson of the IIT Council.

Currently, there are 23 IITs across the country.

List of all Indian Institutes of Technology

History 

The history of the IIT system nearly dates back to 1946 when Sir Jogendra Singh of the Viceroy's Executive Council set up a committee whose task was to consider the creation of Higher Technical Institutions for post-war industrial development in India.

The 22-member committee, headed by Nalini Ranjan Sarkar, recommended the establishment of these institutions in various parts of India, along the lines of the Massachusetts Institute of Technology (MIT), with affiliated secondary institutions.

The first Indian Institute of Technology was founded in May 1950 at the site of the Hijli Detention Camp in Kharagpur, West Bengal. The name "Indian Institute of Technology" was adopted before the formal inauguration of the institute on 18 August 1951 by Maulana Abul Kalam Azad.

On 15 September 1956, the Parliament of India passed the Indian Institute of Technology (Kharagpur) Act, declaring it as an Institute of National Importance. Jawaharlal Nehru, first Prime Minister of India, in the first convocation address of IIT Kharagpur in 1956, said:

On the recommendations of the Sarkar Committee, four campuses were established at Bombay (1958), Madras (1959), Kanpur (1959), and Delhi (1961). The location of these campuses was chosen to be scattered throughout India to prevent regional imbalance. The Indian Institutes of Technology Act was amended to reflect the addition of new IITs.

Student agitations in the state of Assam made Prime Minister Rajiv Gandhi promise the creation of a new IIT in Assam. This led to the establishment of a sixth institution at Guwahati under the Assam Accord in 1994.

In 2001, the University of Roorkee was converted into IIT Roorkee.
Over the past few years, there have been several developments toward establishing new IITs. On 1 October 2003, Prime Minister Atal Bihari Vajpayee announced plans to create more IITs "by upgrading existing academic institutions that have the necessary promise and potential". Subsequent developments led to the formation of the S K Joshi Committee, in November 2003, to guide the selection of the five institutions which would be converted into IITs. Based on the initial recommendations of the Sarkar Committee, it was decided that new IITs should be spread throughout the country. When the government expressed its willingness to correct this regional imbalance, 16 states demanded IITs. Since the S K Joshi Committee prescribed strict guidelines for institutions aspiring to be IITs, only seven colleges were selected for final consideration. Plans are also reported to open IITs outside India, although there has not been much progress in this regard. Eventually in the 11th Five year plan, eight states were identified for establishment of new IITs.

From 2008 to 2009, eight new IITs were set up in Gandhinagar, Jodhpur, Hyderabad, Indore, Patna, Bhubaneswar, Ropar, and Mandi. Following a similar selection process since 1972, in 2012 the Institute of Technology, Banaras Hindu University was made a member of the IITs and renamed as IIT (BHU) Varanasi.

In 2015 to 2016, six new IITs in Tirupati, Palakkad, Dharwad, Bhilai, Goa, and Jammu, approved through a 2016 bill amendment, were founded, along with the conversion of Indian School of Mines Dhanbad into IIT (Indian School of Mines), Dhanbad.

However, the aggregate money spent by Indian students for tertiary education in the United States was about six times more than what the central government spends on all IITs.

Organisational structure 

The President of India is the ex officio Visitor, and has residual powers. Directly under the President is the IIT Council, comprising minister-in-charge of technical education in the Union Government, the Chairmen of all IITs, the Directors of all IITs, the Chairman of the University Grants Commission, the Director General of CSIR, the Chairman of IISc, the Director of IISc, three members of Parliament, the Joint Council Secretary of Ministry of Education, and three appointees each of the Union Government, AICTE, and the Visitor.

Under the IIT Council is the Board of Governors of each IIT. Under the Board of Governors is the Director, who is the chief academic and executive officer of the IIT. Under the Director, in the organisational structure, comes the Deputy Director. Under the Director and the deputy director, come the Deans, Heads of Departments, Registrar, President of the Students' Council, and Chairman of the Hall Management Committee. The Registrar is the chief administrative officer of the IIT and overviews the day-to-day operations. Below the Heads of Department (HOD) are the faculty members (Professors, Associate Professors, and Assistant Professors). The Wardens come under the Chairman of the Hall Management Committee.

The Institutes of Technology Act 

The Institute of Technology act (parliamentary legislation) gives legal status, including degree granting powers, to the Indian Institutes of Technology (IITs). It was notified in the gazette as Act number 59 of 1961 on 20 December 1961 and came into effect on 1 April 1962. The Act also declares these institutes as Institutes of National Importance.

Academics 

The IITs receive comparatively higher grants than other engineering colleges in India. While the total government funding to most other engineering colleges is around  100–200 million ($– million) per year, the amount varies between  900–1300 million ($– million) per year for each IIT. Other sources of funds include student fees and research funding from industry and contributions from the alumni. The faculty-to-student ratio in the IITs is between 1:6 and 1:8. The Standing Committee of IIT Council (SCIC) prescribes the lower limit for faculty-to-student ratio as 1:9, applied department wise. The IITs subsidize undergraduate student fees by approximately 80% and provide scholarships to all Master of Technology students and Research Scholars (PhD) in order to encourage students for higher studies, per the recommendations of the Thacker Committee (1959–1961). Students from the OBC, ST, SC categories, female students as well as physically challenged students are also entitled to scholarships.

The various IITs function autonomously, and their special status as Institutes of National Importance facilitates the smooth running of IITs, virtually free from both regional as well as student politics. Such autonomy means that IITs can create their own curricula and adapt rapidly to the changes in educational requirements, free from bureaucratic hurdles. The government has no direct control over internal policy decisions of IITs (like faculty recruitment and curricula) but has representation on the IIT Council. The medium of instruction in all IITs is English. The electronic libraries allow students to access on-line journals and periodicals. The IITs and IISc, Bengaluru have taken an initiative along with Ministry of Education to provide free online videos of actual lectures of different disciplines under National Programme on Technology Enhanced Learning. This initiative is undertaken to make quality education accessible to all students.

The academic policies of each IIT are decided by its Senate. This comprises all professors of the IIT and student representatives. Unlike many western universities that have an elected senate, the IITs have an academic senate. It controls and approves the curriculum, courses, examinations and results, and appoints committees to look into specific academic matters. The teaching, training and research activities of the institute are periodically reviewed by the senate to maintain educational standards. The Director of an IIT is the ex-officio Chairman of the Senate.

All the IITs follow the credits system of performance evaluation, with proportional weighting of courses based on their importance. The total marks (usually out of 100) form the basis of grades, with a grade value (out of 10) assigned to a range of marks. Sometimes, relative grading is done considering the overall performance of the whole class. For each semester, the students are graded on a scale of 0 to 10 based on their performance, by taking a weighted average of the grade points from all the courses, with their respective credit points. Each semester evaluation is done independently and then the weighted average over all semesters is used to calculate the cumulative Grade Point Average (known as CGPA or CPI—Cumulative Performance Index).

Undergraduate education degrees 

The Bachelor of Technology (BTech) degree is the most common undergraduate degree in the IITs in terms of student enrollment, although Bachelor of Science (BS) degree, dual degrees integrating Master of Science or Master of Arts are also offered. The BTech course is based on a 4-year program with eight semesters, while the Dual Degree and Integrated courses are 5-year programs with ten semesters. In all IITs, the first year of BTech and Dual Degree courses are marked by a common course structure for all the students, though in some IITs, a single department introduction related course is also included. The common courses include the basics from most of the departments like Computers, Electronics, Mechanics, Chemistry, Electrical and Physics. At the end of first year (the end of first semester at IIT Madras, IIT Hyderabad, IIT Bhilai, IIT Palakkad, and IIT Roorkee), an option to change departments is given to meritorious students on the basis of their performance in the first two semesters. Few such changes ultimately take place as the criteria for them are usually strict, limited to the most meritorious students.

From the second year onward, the students study subjects exclusively from their respective departments. In addition to these, the students have to take compulsory advanced courses from other departments in order to broaden their education. Separate compulsory courses from humanities and social sciences department, and sometimes management courses are also enforced. In the last year of their studies, most of the students are placed into industries and organisations via the placement process of the respective IIT, though some students opt out of this either when going for higher studies or when they take up jobs by applying to the companies directly.

Postgraduate education

Master's degrees and postgraduate diplomas 
The IITs offer a number of postgraduate programs including Master of Technology (MTech), Master of Business Administration (MBA), and Master of Science (MSc). Some IITs offer specialised graduate programmes such as Master of Design (M.Des.), the Post Graduate Diploma in Information Technology (PGDIT), Masters in Medical Science and Technology (MMST), Masters in City Planning (MCP), Master of Arts (MA), Postgraduate Diploma in intellectual property Law (PGDIPL), and the Postgraduate Diploma in Maritime Operation & Management (PGDMOM).

Some of the IITs offer an M.S. (by research) program; the MTech and M.S. are similar to the US universities' non-thesis (course based) and thesis (research based) masters programs respectively. Admissions to masters programs in engineering are made using scores of the Graduate Aptitude Test in Engineering (GATE), while those to masters programs in science are made using scores of the Joint Admission Test for M.Sc. (JAM).

Several IITs have schools of management offering master's degrees in management or business administration.

In April 2015, IIT Bombay launched the first U.S.-India joint EMBA program alongside Washington University in St. Louis.

Bachelors-Masters dual degrees 
The IITs also offer an unconventional BTech and MTech integrated educational program called "Dual Degree". It integrates undergraduate and postgraduate studies in selected areas of specialisation. It is completed in five years as against six years in conventional BTech (four years) followed by an MTech (two years). Integrated Master of Science programs are also offered at few IITs which integrates the Undergraduate and Postgraduate studies in Science streams in a single degree program against the conventional university system. These programs were started to allow its graduates to complete postgraduate studies from IIT rather than having to go to another institute.

Doctoral 
The IITs also offer the Doctor of Philosophy degree (PhD) as part of their doctoral education programme. In it, the candidates are given a topic of academic interest by the ins or have to work on a consultancy project given by the industries. The duration of the program is usually unspecified and depends on the specific discipline. PhD candidates have to submit a dissertation as well as provide an oral defence for their thesis. Teaching Assistantships (TA) and Research Assistantships (RA) are often provided.

The IITs, along with NITs and IISc, account for nearly 80% of all engineering PhDs in India. IITs now allow admission in PhD programs without the mandatory GATE score.

Culture and student life 
All the IITs provide on-campus residential facilities to the students, research scholars and faculty. The students live in hostels (sometimes referred to as halls) throughout their stay in the IIT. Students in all IITs must choose among National Cadet Corps (NCC), National Service Scheme (NSS) and National Sports Organisation (NSO) in their first years. All the IITs have sports grounds for basketball, cricket, football (soccer), hockey, volleyball, lawn tennis, badminton, athletics and swimming pools for aquatic events. Usually the hostels also have their own sports grounds.

Moreover, an Inter IIT Sports Meet is organised annually where participants from all 23 IITs contest for the General Championship Trophy in 13 different sports.

Technical and cultural festivals 

All IITs organize annual technical festivals, typically lasting three or four days. The technical festivals are Shaastra (IIT Madras), Kshitij (IIT Kharagpur), Techfest (IIT Bombay), Technex (IIT-BHU Varanasi), Cognizance (IIT Roorkee), Concetto (IIT-ISM Dhanbad), Tirutsava ( IIT Tirupati), Nvision (IIT Hyderabad), Meraz (IIT Bhilai), Amalthea, (IIT Gandhinagar), Techkriti (IIT Kanpur), Tryst (IIT Delhi), Techniche (IIT Guwahati), Wissenaire (IIT Bhubaneswar), Technunctus (IIT Jammu), Exodia (IIT Mandi), Fluxus (IIT Indore), Celesta (IIT Patna) and IGNUS (IIT Jodhpur). Most of them are organized in the months of January or March. Techfest (IIT Bombay) is also one of the most popular and largest technical festivals in Asia in terms of participants and prize money involved. It has been granted patronage from United Nations Educational, Scientific and Cultural Organisation (UNESCO) for providing a platform for students to showcase their talent in science and technology. Shaastra holds the distinction of being the first student-managed event in the world to implement a formal Quality Management System, earning ISO 9001:2000 certification. Kshitij, which is branded as a techno-management festival due to its emphasis on both technology and management, is the largest of these festivals by sponsorship money.

Annual cultural festivals are also organized by the IITs and last three to four days. These include Thomso (IIT Roorkee), Kashiyatra (IIT BHU Varanasi), Alcheringa (IIT Guwahati), Exodia (IIT Mandi), Saarang and Paradox (annual fests of IIT Madras BTech and BS Degree respectively), Spring Fest (IIT Kharagpur, also known as SF), Rendezvous (IIT Delhi), Meraz (IIT Bhilai), Tirutsava (IIT Tirupati), Srijan, (earlier known as Saturnalia, IIT Dhanbad), Tarang (culfest) (previously Rave), Anwesha (IIT Patna), SPANDAN (IIT Jodhpur), Renao (IIT Jammu), Petrichor (IIT Palakkad), Blithchron (IIT Gandhinagar), ELAN (IIT Hyderabad), Alma Fiesta (IIT Bhubaneswar), Mood Indigo (IIT Bombay, also known as Mood-I), Antaragni (IIT Kanpur) and Zeitgeist (IIT Ropar).

Academic rankings 
IITs have generally ranked above other all other engineering colleges in India for Engineering. According to Outlook India Top Engineering Colleges of 2017, the top four engineering colleges within India were IITs. In the 2019 QS World University Ranking, IIT Bombay ranked highest at 162, followed by IIT Delhi (172), IIT Madras (264), IIT Kanpur (283), IIT Kharagpur (295), IIT Roorkee (381) and IIT Guwahati (472). In the 2022 NIRF rankings published by Ministry of Education, India, IIT Madras has been ranked 1st for seven consecutive years in the Engineering Category and for four consecutive years in the Overall Category.

Criticism 
The IITs have faced criticism from within and outside academia. Major concerns include allegations that they encourage brain drain and that their stringent entrance examinations encourage coaching colleges and put heavy pressure on the student's body. Recently some prominent IITians have also questioned the quality of teaching and research in IITs.

With the tripling the number of IITs in recent decades, the newly created institutes have struggled to establish themselves compared to their peers. A 2021 report by Comptroller and Auditor General of India criticized the newer IITs for not meeting targets for research, faculty and student recruitment, students retention, as well as for being beset with infrastructure delays.

In the recent past, the number of student suicides has attracted significant attention.

Brain drain 
Among the criticisms of the IIT system by the media and academia, a common notion is that it encourages brain drain. This trend has been reversed somewhat (dubbed the reverse brain drain) as hundreds of IIT graduates, who have pursued further studies in the US, started returning to India in the 1990s. Additionally, IIT alumni are giving back generously to their parent institutions. Until liberalisation started in the early 1990s, India experienced large scale emigration of IIT graduates to developed countries, especially to the United States. Since 1953, nearly twenty-five thousand IIT graduates have settled in the US. Since the US benefited from subsidized education in IITs at the cost of Indian taxpayers' money, critics say that subsidising education in IITs is useless. Others support the emigration of graduates, arguing that the capital sent home by the IIT graduates has been a major source of the expansion of foreign exchange reserves for India, which, until the 1990s, had a substantial trade deficit.

The extent of intellectual loss receded substantially over the 1990s and 2000s, with the percentage of students going abroad dropping from as high as 70% at one time to around 30% in 2005. This is largely attributed to the liberalization of the Indian economy and the opening of previously closed markets. Government initiatives are encouraging IIT students into entrepreneurship programs and are increasing foreign investment. Emerging scientific and manufacturing industries, and outsourcing of technical jobs from North America and Western Europe have created opportunities for aspiring graduates in India. Many undergraduates go abroad to pursue further studies, such as MS, MBA, and PhD.

Entrance competition 
The highly competitive examination in the form of IIT-JEE has led to the establishment of a large number of coaching institutes throughout the country that provide intensive, and specific preparation for the IIT-JEE for substantial fees. It is argued that this favours students from specific regions and richer backgrounds. Some coaching institutes say that they have individually coached nearly 800 successful candidates year after year. According to some estimates, nearly 95% of all students who clear the IIT-JEE had joined coaching classes. Indeed, this was the case regarding preparation for IIT entrance exams even decades ago. In a January 2010 lecture at the Indian Institute of Science, the 2009 Nobel laureate in Chemistry, Venkatraman Ramakrishnan revealed that he failed to get a seat at any of the Indian engineering and medical colleges. He also said that his parents, being old-fashioned, did not believe in coaching classes to prepare for the IIT entrance exam and considered them to be "nonsense".

In a documentary aired by CBS, Vinod Khosla, co-founder of Sun Microsystems states, "The IITs probably are the hardest schools in the world to get into, to the best of my knowledge". The documentary further concludes, "Put Harvard, MIT, and Princeton together, and you begin to get an idea of the status of IIT in India" to depict the competition as well as demand for the elite institutes.

Not all children are of a similar aptitude level and may be skilled in different paradigms and fields. This has led to criticism of the way the examinations are conducted and the way a student is forced in the Indian community. The IIT-JEE format was restructured in 2006 following these complaints.
After the change to the objective pattern of questioning, even the students who initially considered themselves not fit for subjective pattern of IIT-JEE decided to take the examination. Though the restructuring was meant to reduce the dependence of students on coaching classes, it led to an increase in students registering for coaching classes. Some people (mostly IIT graduates) have criticized the changed pattern of the IIT-JEE. Their reasoning is that while IIT-JEE traditionally used to test students understanding of fundamentals and ability to apply them to solve tough unseen problems, the current pattern does not stress much on the application part and might lead to a reduced quality of students.

IIT-JEE is conducted only in English and Hindi, making it harder for students with regional languages as their main language. In September 2011, the Gujarat High Court has acted on a Public Interest Litigation by the Gujarati Sahitya Parishad, for conducting the exams in Gujarati. A second petition was made in October by Navsari's Sayaji Vaibhav Sarvajanik Pustakalaya Trust. Another petition was made at the Madras High Court for conducting the exam in Tamil. In the petition it was claimed that not conducting the exam in the regional languages is in violation of article 14 of the Constitution of India. IIT council recommended major changes in entrance examination structure which is effective from 2017 onwards.

Alumni 

IITs have many alumni.

See also 
 Indian Institutes of Management(IIMs)
 Indian Institutes of Information Technology (IIITs)
 National Institutes of Technology(NITs)
 National Institute of Design(NID)

References

Further reading

External links

  IIT Council
The Institutes of Technology Act, 1961 (PDF)

 
Nehru administration